The Strange Countess is a 1961 West German crime film directed by Josef von Báky and starring Lil Dagover, Joachim Fuchsberger and Marianne Hoppe. It is based on Edgar Wallace's 1925 novel of the same title, and is part of a long-running series of Wallace adaptations produced by Rialto Film.

It was shot at the Tempelhof Studios in Berlin. Location shooting took place at the Schloss Ahrensburg. The film's sets were designed by the art director Helmut Nentwig.

Cast
 Lil Dagover as Lady Leonora Moron (title role)
 Joachim Fuchsberger as inspector Michael 'Mike' Dorn
 Brigitte Grothum as Margaret Lois Reedle
 Marianne Hoppe as Mary Pinder
 Rudolf Fernau as Dr. Tappatt
 Richard Häussler as Chesney Praye
 Edith Hancke as Lizzy Smith
 Eddi Arent as Lord Selwyn 'Selly' Moron
 Fritz Rasp as solicitor Shaddle
 Reinhard Kolldehoff as Oliver Frank aka John Addams
 Alexander Engel as patient
 Klaus Kinski as Bresset
 Albert Bessler as prison warden Duffon (uncredited)

Release
The FSK gave the film a rating of 16 years and older, not suitable for public holidays. The film premiered on 8 November 1961 at the Capitol in Trier.

References

Bibliography
 Bergfelder, Tim. International Adventures: German Popular Cinema and European Co-Productions in the 1960s. Berghahn Books, 2005.

External links

1961 films
1960s mystery films
1960s crime thriller films
German mystery films
German crime thriller films
West German films
1960s German-language films
German black-and-white films
Films directed by Josef von Báky
Films based on British novels
Films based on works by Edgar Wallace
Films set in psychiatric hospitals
Films produced by Horst Wendlandt
Films set in England
Constantin Film films
Films shot at Tempelhof Studios
1960s German films